Aleksander Kulisiewicz (7 August 1918 – 12 March 1982) was a Polish singer, journalist and holocaust survivor.

Early life 
Kulisiewicz was born on 7 August, 1918 in Krakow. He studied law in German-occupied Poland and worked as a journalist. In 1940, in reaction to his article Heil butter! - Enough of Adolf Hitler! in he was deported to the Sachsenhausen concentration camp. In the camp, he sang and learned songs passed on to him by other inmates.

Post War 
Following liberation, and the end of World War II, he began to document the songs he had learned from other inmates. He dictated hundreds of songs in four languages to a nurse in Krakow. Due to his extensive interpretations of camp songs, he was nicknamed the Singer from Hell.

Kulisiewicz died on 12 March, 1982 in Krakow. He is buried at Salwator Cemetery.

References 

1918 births
1982 deaths
Polish Holocaust survivors
Polish singers
Polish journalists
Burials at Salwator Cemetery